Philippe Couillard  (born June 26, 1957) is a Canadian business advisor and former neurosurgeon, university professor and politician who served as 31st premier of Quebec from 2014 to 2018. Between 2003 and 2008, he was Quebec's Minister of Health and Social Services in Jean Charest's Liberal government and was MNA for Mont-Royal until he resigned in 2008. In the 2014 election, Couillard moved to the riding of Roberval, where he resides. He was the leader of the Quebec Liberal Party from 2013 to 2018. He resigned as Liberal leader and MNA on October 4, 2018.

Background and early life 
Couillard was born in Montreal, Quebec, the son of Canadian-born Joseph Alfred Jean Pierre Couillard de Lespinay and French-born Hélène Yvonne Pardé. He holds a medical degree and a certification in neurosurgery from the Université de Montréal. He was the head of the department of neurosurgery at Hôpital Saint-Luc from 1989 to 1992 and again at the Centre Hospitalier Universitaire de Sherbrooke from 1996 to 2003. From 1992 to 1996, he practised in Dhahran, Saudi Arabia.

Political career 
In 2003, Couillard left the medical profession to run for the Montreal-area seat of Mont-Royal in the National Assembly, representing the Quebec Liberal Party. He was elected in the 2003 election and was appointed Minister of Health and Social Services on April 29, 2003.

After taking office, he proved skillful in the handling of his department's public relations and was regarded by some as the most popular minister in the Charest government. His accomplishments during his tenure included a $4.2 billion increase in the Quebec health budget, the prohibition of smoking in public places, and a reduction in the number of union local accreditations in the health sector.

In 2007, Couillard ran in the riding of Jean-Talon in the Quebec City area, replacing Margaret Delisle who did not seek re-election due to health reasons. Couillard won his seat in the 2007 election despite the Action démocratique du Québec's (ADQ) strong performance in the region in which the party gained the majority of the seats. Pierre Arcand succeeded Couillard in the Mont-Royal riding. Couillard was reappointed as minister of health and social services, as well as minister responsible for the provincial Capitale-Nationale (Quebec) region.

On June 25, 2008, Couillard announced his resignation as minister and MNA. He was succeeded as minister and Jean-Talon MNA by locally-known Alma doctor Yves Bolduc.

On June 23, 2010, Couillard was appointed to the Security Intelligence Review Committee and consequently became a member of the Privy Council.

On October 3, 2012, Couillard became the third person to enter the leadership election to succeed Jean Charest as leader of the Quebec Liberal Party. When asked why he was re-entering politics, he said, "I feel the need to serve."

On March 17, 2013, Couillard became the leader of the Quebec Liberal Party, beating ex-cabinet ministers Raymond Bachand and Pierre Moreau.
On December 9, 2013, he was elected MNA for the safe Liberal seat of Outremont after Bachand stood down from the seat in his favour.

Quebec election, 2014

On March 5, 2014, amid weeks of speculation that the Parti Québécois would call a snap election, Lieutenant Governor Pierre Duchesne dropped the writs for a general election at the request of Premier Pauline Marois.  Couillard opted to run in the riding of Roberval, where he now lives, handing Outremont to star candidate Hélène David.

When the election campaign began, polls showed a close race between the Parti Québécois and the Liberals.  However, the PQ held a wide lead among francophone voters, giving the advantage in terms of seat distribution to the PQ. Couillard stated that his campaign would focus on "healthcare, education and jobs". He also accused Premier Pauline Marois of mismanaging Quebec's economy, saying that "Quebec is living beyond its means". He also clarified his opposition to the Quebec Charter of Values, describing it as "an unnecessary bill that succeeds only in dividing Quebecers".

Over the course of the next couple of weeks, the polls began to break heavily in the favour of Couillard and the Liberals as the PQ began to bleed support to all 3 major opposition parties. His second debate performance was not as strong as his first one, and he was criticized by both Pauline Marois and François Legault of the CAQ for suggesting that a factory worker in Quebec ought to be bilingual in the event that an Anglophone businessperson was to walk on the floor. While his comment was portrayed by his critics as proof that he was soft on the French language issue, his poll numbers continued to exceed those of his opponents.

On April 7, Couillard led the Quebec Liberals to a sweeping victory, winning 70 seats in the National Assembly and a return to government a mere 19 months after being ousted in one of their poorest election showings in the party's history. The Liberals even managed to unseat Marois in her own riding. On election night, Couillard stressed the importance of creating a better business climate in Quebec and doing away with some of the divisive policies that had characterized Marois' tenure as Premier. He also pledged to work cooperatively with other provinces and the federal government and to reassert Quebec's place as a leader in the Canadian federation.

Premier of Quebec 

Returning the Liberal Party of Quebec back to a majority government, after an eighteen-month stint led by Pauline Marois and the Parti Quebecois, Couillard assumed office on April 23, 2014, naming 26 ministers to his cabinet.

Economic policy 

After the Liberals were elected in April 2014, the budget deficit was nearly $6 billion. Couillard's government and his finance minister, Carlos Leitão, balanced the budget only one year later in 2015 through spending cuts and raising taxes. Couillard's government ran four consecutive balanced budgets during his tenure as premier. However, his cuts to education and healthcare spending caused his popularity to decline.

Environment 

Couillard's government removed protection of several preserved areas while authorizing logging in caribou land. The government claimed that this decision would grow the economy and jobs.

In 2014, Couillard announced his opposition to the development of shale gas, citing a report that raised environmental concerns.

Religious symbols 

In October 2017, Couillard's government passed Bill 62, a Quebec ban on face covering. This law gained national and international attention, as Muslim women who wear a niqab or burqa would have to remove their religious garments to uncover their face to access public services. Couillard supported the law, saying "We are in a free and democratic society. You speak to me, I should see your face, and you should see mine. It's as simple as that."

Quebec election, 2018

Couillard's government was ousted after only one term by the Coalition Avenir Québec in the October 2018 provincial election. Couillard himself easily won reelection in Roberval. He resigned as party leader and MNA on October 4, 2018.

Electoral record

|-

|Liberal
|Philippe Couillard
|align="right"|13,732
|align="right"|41.96
|align="right"|-4.64
|-

|-

|-

|}
* Increase is from UFP

Business career
In September 2022, Couillard was reported to be involved with the Canadian activities of a UK-based company Britishvolt, lobbying to build a gigafactory in Canada. However, by the end of November 2022, the company was reported to have abandoned its ambitions to build a factory in Canada; Couillard reportedly ceased working for Britishvolt in October 2022.

References

External links

Philippe Couillard at The Canadian Encyclopedia

1957 births
Quebec Liberal Party MNAs
Living people
Université de Montréal alumni
Politicians from Montreal
Members of the King's Privy Council for Canada
Quebec political party leaders
Premiers of Quebec
Canadian neurosurgeons
Canadian people of French descent
French Quebecers
Academic staff of the Université de Sherbrooke
Members of the Executive Council of Quebec
Health ministers of Quebec